The Rouncefall television relay station serves parts of Essex, UK. Being a relay of Sudbury transmitting station, the transmitter is in the BBC East and ITV Anglia TV regions.

From July 2011 digital TV services started broadcasting from the transmitter when three digital multiplexes (known as Freeview Lite) were made available.

The antenna is a 31-metre-high (102 ft-high) mobile phone mast. All TV transmissions from the Rouncefall site are horizontally polarised.

Transmitted services

Digital television

References

External links
Rouncefall entry at the mb21 transmitter gallery

Transmitter sites in England